WQOX (88.5 FM) is a radio station  broadcasting an Urban Adult Contemporary format. Licensed to Memphis, Tennessee, United States, the station is currently owned by Memphis-Shelby County Schools.  The station's studios are located at the Communications Center (adjacent to MSCS headquarters) in Midtown Memphis, and its transmitter is in Cordova, Tennessee.

References

External links
WQOX Website

QOX
Urban adult contemporary radio stations in the United States